The Mauritian records in swimming are the fastest ever performances of swimmers from Mauritius, which are recognised and ratified by the Federation Mauricienne De Natation.

All records were set in finals unless noted otherwise.

Long Course (50 m)

Men

Women

Mixed relay

Short Course (25 m)

Men

Women

Mixed relay

References

Mauritius
Records
Swimming
Swimming